Lahitère is a commune in the Haute-Garonne department in southwestern France.

Geography
The commune is bordered by three other communes, two of them is in Haute-Garonne, and one in Ariège: Montesquieu-Volvestre to the east, Montberaud to the northwest, and finally by the department of Ariège to the southwest by the commune of Sainte-Croix-Volvestre.

Population

See also
Communes of the Haute-Garonne department

References

Communes of Haute-Garonne